Yllka Mujo (born 15 October 1953) is an Albanian actress, especially known for her roles in Albanian movies during the communist regime. For her acting merits she was given the title Merited Artist of Albania.

Life 
Yllka Muji (or Mujo) comes from an Albanian family that moved from Tuz, Kingdom of Yugoslavia (now Montenegro), to Shkodër during the Monarchist period. She was born in the capital Tirana and was sister of actor Agim Mujo (1955/1956–2019). In recognition to her career, she was also given the title of "Maestro of Arts" in the National Theatre of Albania.

Mujo married (now divorced) Haig Zaharinë then Gjergj Polikron Zaharia, born in Përmet, and had one son, Amos Muji Zaharia (b. 1987), an actor and film director; and one daughter, Elia Zaharia Zogu (b. 1983), an actress and singer who married Leka, Crown Prince of Albania on 8 October 2016.

Filmography 
 I teti në bronz (1970)
 Malet me blerim mbuluar (1971)
 Beni ecën vetë (1975)
 Rrugicat që kërkonin diell (1975)
 Zonja nga qyteti (1976)
 Kur hidheshin themelet (1978)
 Taulanti kërkon një motër (1984)
 Rikonstruksioni (1988)
 Shpella e piratëvet (1990)
 Lettere al vento (2003)
 Lule të kuqe, lule të zeza (2003)
 Honeymoons (2009)
 Shqiptari (2010)
 Përballë (2015)

External links 
 
 http://www.nla.gov.au/pub/nlanews/2000/jun00/story-4.pdf
 http://www.merchantnetworks.com.au/genealogy/web/godschalljohnson/pafg07.htm#29845

1953 births
Living people
Albanian actresses
Albanian film actresses
Albanian stage actresses
20th-century Albanian actresses
Merited Artists of Albania
Albanian voice actresses
People from Tirana